Abby Imogen Mavers (born 20 April 1990) is an English actress. She played Dynasty Barry in the BBC One school-based drama series, Waterloo Road, from 2013 until 2014.

Filmography

Personal life
She is the daughter of actor Gary Mavers, and the niece of musician Lee Mavers, frontman of The La's. Mavers was in a relationship with her Waterloo Road co-star Tommy Knight for several years.

References

External links
 

1990 births
20th-century English actresses
21st-century English actresses
English television actresses
Living people
Actresses from Liverpool